Royston Cyril John Sully (born 10 April 1951), played one List A Cricket match for Somerset in the 1985 season.

Sully, who was born at Taunton, was a right-arm medium-pace bowler and a right-handed lower order batsman who had played occasional matches for Somerset's second eleven in the Minor Counties Championship and the Second Eleven Championship from 1977, often opening the bowling and making useful lower order runs. He was brought into Somerset's first team for the Sunday League match against Glamorgan in May 1985 at Taunton. He scored two runs in Somerset's innings and bowled two overs that cost 15 runs, failing to take a wicket.

References

1951 births
Living people
English cricketers
Somerset cricketers
Sportspeople from Taunton